Avon School may refer to:

Avon School, a primary school in Stratford, New Zealand 
Avon High School (disambiguation)

See also
Avon School District (disambiguation)